Coles Creek is a rural locality in the Gympie Region, Queensland, Australia.

History 
Traveston Provisional School opened on 24 August 1891. In 1907 the school was renamed Skyring's Creek Provisional School. On 1 January 1909 it became Skyring's Creek State School. In 1915 the school was renamed Coles Creek State School. It  closed on 27 February 1961. The school was located on the northern corner of the Old Bruce Highway and Coles Creek Road (approx ).

Geography
The Mary River forms the western and south-western boundaries. Coles Creek (the watercourse) flows through from east to north, where it forms part of the northern boundary before it joins the Mary. Skyring Creek forms the southern boundary before it flows into the Mary.

Road infrastructure
The Bruce Highway runs through from east to north.

References 

Gympie Region
Localities in Queensland